Haplochorema magnum is a species of flowering plant in the ginger family, Zingiberaceae. A Borneo endemic, it was first formally named in 1987 by Rosemary Margaret Smith.

References

Zingiberoideae
Endemic flora of Borneo
Taxa named by Rosemary Margaret Smith